Mohammad Reza Soleimani (born 3 August 1995) is an Iranian football forward, who currently plays for Mes Rafsanjan in the Persian Gulf Pro League.

Soleimani started playing football when he was 7 years old. He played for toddlers' and youth teams in matches between states.

He has played for PAS Hamedan F.C., Esteghlal F.C. and the Iran U19 national team. His good performance in Esteghlal F.C. U20 with 20 goals, led to his transfer to Rah Ahan, where he also performed well in the U20 team with 25 goals and 7 assists in seven matches.

Rah Ahan 
When Rah Ahan F.C. was in Premier League, he scored 4 goals and 11 assists.

Saipa F.C. 
In the first days of 2017 he contracted with Saipa F.C. He has scored 6 goals for Saipa in two seasons.

References

External links
 Mohammad Reza Soleimani at FFIRI

Living people
1995 births
Iranian footballers
PAS Hamedan F.C. players
Esteghlal F.C. players
Rah Ahan players
Iran under-20 international footballers
Association football forwards
People from Hamadan